The European Journal of Minority Studies is a quarterly peer-reviewed academic journal published by  on behalf of the  (Bolzano). It covers minority languages, cultures, and identities. The journal was established in 2008 and originally published by Springer Science + Business Media. From 2013 to 2015 it was published by Verlag Österreich, moving to its current publisher in 2016.

External links

Publications established in 2008
Multilingual journals
European studies journals
Quarterly journals